The Kastellorizo-Kas swim is an international cross-border open water swimming competition between the Greek island of Kastellorizo or Megisti and the village of Kaş in the county of Antalya. It has been held since 2005 annually in June to promote the friendship between the two neighboring countries.

The swimming competition is part of the International Lycia-Kaş Culture and Art Festival, which ls being held since late 1990s. The race begins at the Kastellorizo harbour and ends in the harbour of Antifellos. Participants must be at least 18 years of age, and must be able or to swim 1,500 m in less than 30 minutes. The competitors undergo a health examination administered by a physician before the event.

In 2019, 180 swimmers from 12 nations, including 33 women, took part in the competition. The course record was set in 2019 by the Turkish 20-year-old woman Nilay Erkal with a time of 1 hour and 32 minutes, who improved her own record by five minutes, and was the winner of the competition in the last three years.

References

External links
Official website "Meis Kaş Yarışı" (in Turkish)

Open water swimming competitions
Cross-border races
Greece–Turkey relations
2005 establishments in Greece
2005 establishments in Turkey
Sports organizations established in 2005
June observances
Annual sporting events in Greece
Annual sporting events in Turkey
Swimming competitions in Greece
Swimming competitions in Turkey
Kastellorizo
Kaş District
Sport in Antalya
Mediterranean Sea